London Nahi Jaunga  ) is a 2022 Pakistani drama comedy film, directed by Nadeem Baig, produced by Humayun Saeed under the banner of Six Sigma Plus, and written by Khalil-ur-Rehman Qamar. It is a spin-off of the 2017 film Punjab Nahi Jaungi. It stars Huamayun Saeed and Mehwish Hayat alongside Sohail Ahmed, Kubra Khan, Asif Raza Mir and Saba Faisal in supporting roles.

The film was released theatrically on 10 July 2022 on the occasion of Eid al-Adha and received mixed reviews from critics towards its storyline. It is currently the second highest-grossing Pakistani film of 2022 and the third-highest-grossing Pakistani film of all time.

Cast
 Humayun Saeed as Choudhary Jameel
 Mehwish Hayat as Zara Tiwana
 Sohail Ahmad as Choudhary; Jameel's father
 Saba Faisal as Chaudrani; Jameel's mother
 Kubra Khan as Arzoo Tiwana
 Asif Raza Mir as Haqnawaz Tiwana
 Saba Hameed as Sara Tiwana; Zara's mother
 Vasay Choudhary as Harry
 Gohar Rasheed as Bhatti
 Iffat Omar as Haqnawaz's wife
 Mehar Bano as Arzoo's friend

Release

The film's official trailer was released on 11 June 2022. The film was released on 7 July 2022 in UAE, and had a worldwide release on 8 July 2022. The film was released in Pakistan on 10 July 2022, coinciding with Eid-ul-Adha.

Home media

The film started digitally streaming on Tamasha from 14 October 2022.

Reception

Box office

As of 4 August 2022, London Nahi Jaunga has grossed PKR 27.35 crore in Pakistan, and PKR 24.20 crore in other territories, for a worldwide total of 51.55 crore. It is the eleventh-highest-grossing film in Pakistan domestically and the fourth highest-grossing film released by Six Sigma Plus. London Nahi Jaunga is also the first Pakistani film since Jawani Phir Nahi Ani 2 (2018) to gross over 44 crore worldwide and the first to do so during the COVID-19 pandemic.

In Pakistan, London Nahi Jaunga opened on Sunday (first day of Eid) and minted PKR 1.85 crore. It then showed a growth of nearly 40% on Eid's second day as it collected PKR 2.55 crore. On the 3rd day of Eid it raked in PKR 2.8 crore, taking its opening weekend total to 7.5 crore domestically, surpassing Doctor Strange in the Multiverse of Madness (PKR 7.00 crore) to become the highest domestic box office opening of 2022 in Pakistan. By the end of first week the film has collected PKR 11.46 crore in Pakistan. On July 23, London Nahi Jaunga became the second film of 2022 and third film during the pandemic era to cross the 20 crore mark in Pakistan.

Outside Pakistan, in the first 10 days the film collected a total of 15.50 crore from other markets that includes $164,000 (PKR 3.70 crore) from North America, £240,000 (PKR 6.37 crore) from UK, 170,000 US$(3.75 crore) from UAE, $41,000 (90 lacs) from Australia and $50,000 from other territories. The film grossed  £120,597 [2.99 crores] in its Four Days opening weekend in UK taking its week one total to £173,816, in its 2nd weekend the film collected £66,359. In its third weekend, it made £46,710, upsetting newcomer sas (2022) to remain top of it in UK. As of 25 July 2022 the film has grossed £317,930 [8.67 crore] in UK. In Australia the film has grossed A$34,760 in its opening week. As of July 26, 2022, the top markets are the United Kingdom (£318,000, PKR 8.9cr), North America ($204,000, PKR 4.75 cr), Australia (A$71,000 PKR 1.15cr), UAE ($225k+, PKR 5.25cr) and Norway ($35,000, PKR 80 lacs). As of August 3, 2022, At the end of fourth weekend, the film collected £378,484 (11 cr) from UK, $220,000(5.21 cr) from North America, $205,000(4.85 cr) from UAE, $51,237(1.22 cr) from Australia, $40,000 (95 lacs) from Norway. and approx $40,000+ from extended territories release.

See also 
 List of Pakistani films of 2022
 List of 2022 box office number-one films in Pakistan
 Peechay Tou Dekho
 Quaid-e-Azam Zindabad

References

External links

2022 films
2022 romantic comedy films
Six Sigma Plus
2020s Urdu-language films
Punjabi-language Pakistani films
Films shot in Turkey
Urdu-language Pakistani films